The knight anole (Anolis equestris) is the largest species of anole in the Dactyloidae family. Other common names include Cuban knight anole or Cuban giant anole, highlighting its native country, but it has also been introduced to Florida.  In its native Cuba, this large anole is called chupacocote.

Taxonomy
The knight anole is part of a group of overall similar (in both appearance and behavior, all are crown-giant ecomorphs) anoles from Cuba known as the equestris species complex, including A. baracoae, A. luteogularis, A. noblei, A. pigmaequestris and A. smallwoodi.

These and a few other anole species from Cuba, Hispaniola and Puerto Rico are sometimes placed in their own genus, Deiroptyx.

Geographic range and habitat
Knight anoles are native to Cuba, but have been widely introduced into South Florida, where they reproduce and spread readily as an invasive species. They cannot withstand cold temperatures; in winter freezes in Florida, they have been known to fall to the ground from tree canopies. In highland parts of its native Cuba, a few individuals may rest adjacent to each other during the relatively cold winters (otherwise the species is solitary and highly territorial).

In its introduced Florida range it even occurs in trees along roads in Miami. Knight anoles are arboreal, mostly found high in trees on the trunk or branches in the canopy, but will descend to the ground to get from one tree to another, or for thermoregulation, when occasionally seen on warm asphalt, rocks, or sidewalks.

Appearance 

It is mostly bright green with a yellow stripe on the side of the head and another on the shoulder, but it is able to perform some color changes. It has a pinkish-white dewlap. Juveniles have light bands on the body.

Behavior

Knight anoles are diurnal and fiercely territorial. Initially they turn to face almost any perceived threat, if only from a distance. During its challenge display, a lizard will sit high on all fours, gape menacingly, turn green, and perhaps bob its head. The male will extend its dewlap, and both females and males will "puff themselves up" with air.

Diet
When young, its diet consists mainly of insects. As an adult, it mostly eats invertebrates (notably insects and snails), but regularly take fruits and can function as a seed disperser. They may also take small vertebrates prey such as small birds and reptiles (including other anoles), but studies indicate that they do this less frequently than several other anole species.

Captivity
In captivity, the anole's aggressiveness seems to lessen to a certain degree; if it is raised from the time of its birth and handled, it is common for it to become tame enough to be held. In communal terraria with other species of lizards, it rarely attacks smaller lizards, unless the other reptile intrudes on its territory. It may be hand-fed with caution, since it has a strong bite and many small, sharp teeth.

See also
List of Anolis lizards

References

External links

 https://fl.audubon.org/news/species-spotlight-knight-anole
 https://www.jstor.org/stable/1443790?seq=1
 https://kiercouture.com/knight-anole/

Anoles
Lizards of the Caribbean
Endemic fauna of Cuba
Reptiles of Cuba
Reptiles described in 1820
Taxa named by Blasius Merrem